The New Taipei City Wan Jin Shi Marathon is the first and only one IAAF Silver Label Road Race in Taiwan.

New Taipei City government started to work with Chinese Taipei Athletics Association in 2014 and applied for IAAF Bronze label. The race was awarded Bronze label in October in 2014, and was upgraded to IAAF Silver Label in December 2017.

The 2020 edition of the race was cancelled due to the COVID-19 pandemic, with all registered runners automatically deferred to the 2021 edition without additional payment.

Past winners
Key:

See also
 Taipei Marathon
 List of half marathon races
 List of marathon races in Asia
 List of sporting events in Taiwan

References

External links 
 New Taipei City Wan Jin Shi Marathon
 New Taipei City Wan Jin Shi Marathon | Facebook

Marathons in Taiwan
Recurring sporting events established in 2003
Sport in Taipei
Tourist attractions in Taipei